The Chelan Seamount is a seamount located in the Pacific Ocean off the coast of northern Vancouver Island, British Columbia, Canada.

References

See also
Volcanism in Canada
List of volcanoes in Canada

Seamounts of the Pacific Ocean
Seamounts of Canada